Daniel Patrick Williams (born 19 April 2001) is a Welsh professional footballer who plays as a midfielder for The New Saints on loan from Swansea City.

Career
Williams joined the youth academy of Swansea City as a U8, and signed his first professional contract with the club in the summer of 2019. He made his professional debut with Swansea City in a 3–0 EFL Cup win over Reading on 10 August 2021. He scored his first goal for the club in the following round in a 4-0 win over Plymouth Argyle on 24 August 2021.

Career statistics

References

External links
 

2001 births
Living people
Welsh footballers
Wales under-21 international footballers
Wales youth international footballers
Swansea City A.F.C. players
Dundalk F.C. players
The New Saints F.C. players
League of Ireland players
Cymru Premier players
Association football midfielders